Maximiliano Chirivino (born ) is an Argentine male volleyball player. He is part of the Argentina men's national volleyball team. As of 2017, at club level he plays for Lomas Vóley.

References

External links
 profile at FIVB.org

1989 births
Living people
Argentine men's volleyball players
Place of birth missing (living people)